Grimes Golden is the third album by American indie rock band Further released in 1994.

Track listing 

 California Bummer
 Inert Pieces
 Quiet Riot Grrrl
 Summer Shorts
 Artificial Freedom
 20 Pages
 This Time Around
 Teenage Soul
 V.S. Livingston Seagull

1995 version (Italy, Runt runt07)

 California Bummer
 Inert Pieces
 Quiet Riot Grrrl
 Summer Shorts
 Artificial Freedom
 20 Pages
 This Time Around
 Teenage Soul
 ... V.S. (Livingston Seagull)
 Badgers 1
 Don't Know How Long
 6 Gun Territory
 J.O. Eleven

References

1994 albums